(literally Of free will: Discourses or Comparisons) is the Latin title of a polemical work written by Desiderius Erasmus of Rotterdam in 1524. It is commonly called The Freedom of the Will in English.

History
 was written expressly to refute Martin Luther and his teachings, specifically on the question of free will.

Erasmus had generally avoided involving himself in theological disputes until then; however, he was urged by many of his contemporaries, particularly by his good friend Thomas More, as well as by Pope Clement VII, to apply his skill and learning to answer Luther, who had become increasingly aggressive in his attacks on the Roman Catholic Church.

Content
The disputation between Erasmus and Luther essentially came down to differences of opinion regarding the doctrines of divine justice and divine omniscience and omnipotence. While Luther and many of his fellow reformers prioritized the control and power which God held over creation, Erasmus prioritized the justice and liberality of God toward humankind.

Luther and other reformers proposed that humanity was stripped of free will by sin and that divine predestination ruled all activity within the mortal realm. They held that God was completely omniscient and omnipotent; that anything which happened had to be the result of God's explicit will, and that God's foreknowledge of events in fact brought the events into being.

Foreknowledge and predestination
Erasmus however argued that foreknowledge did not equal predestination. Instead, Erasmus compared God to an astronomer who knows that a solar eclipse is going to occur. The astronomer's foreknowledge does nothing to cause the eclipse—rather his knowledge of what is to come proceeds from an intimate familiarity with the workings of the cosmos. Erasmus held that, as the creator of both the cosmos and mankind, God was so intimately familiar with his creations that he was capable of perfectly predicting events which were to come, even if they were contrary to God's explicit will. He cited biblical examples of God offering prophetic warnings of impending disasters which were contingent on human repentance, as in the case of the prophet Jonah and the people of Nineveh.

Free will and the problem of evil

If humans had no free will, Erasmus argued, then God's commandments and warnings would be vain; and if sinful acts (and the calamities which followed them) were in fact the result of God's predestination, then that would make God a cruel tyrant who punished his creations for sins he had forced them to commit. Rather, Erasmus insisted, God had endowed humanity with free will, valued that trait in humans, and rewarded or punished them according to their own choices between good and evil. He argued that the vast majority of the biblical texts either implicitly or explicitly supported this view, and that divine grace was the means by which humans became aware of God, as well as the force which sustained and motivated humans as they sought of their own free will to follow God's laws.

Erasmus's conclusion
Erasmus ultimately concluded that God was capable of interfering in many things (human nature included) but chose not to do so; thus God could be said to be responsible for many things because he allowed them to occur (or not occur), without having been actively involved in them.

Aftermath
Luther's response to Erasmus came a year later in 1525's On the Bondage of the Will, which Luther himself later considered one of his best pieces of theological writing. In early 1526, Erasmus replied with the first part of his two-volume Hyperaspistes, but that was a longer and more complex work which received comparatively little popular recognition.

Translations
Luther and Erasmus: Free Will and Salvation, translated and edited by E. Gordon Rupp, Philip S. Watson (Philadelphia, The Westminster Press, 1969)
The Battle over Free Will.  Edited, with notes, by Clarence H. Miller. Translated by Clarence H. Miller and Peter Macardle. (Hackett Publishing, 2012)
Discourse on Free Will by Ernst F. Winter (Continuum International Publishing, 2005)

References

1524 books
16th-century Christian texts
16th-century Latin books
Books by Desiderius Erasmus
Philosophy essays